Güneysu District is a district of the Rize Province of Turkey. Its seat is the town of Güneysu. Its area is 159 km2, and its population is 16,066 (2021).

Composition
There is one municipality in Güneysu District:
 Güneysu

There are 18 villages in Güneysu District:

 Asmalıırmak
 Ballıdere
 Başköy
 Bulutlu
 Çamlıca
 Dumankaya
 Gürgen
 Islahiye
 Kıbledağı
 Ortaköy
 Tepebaşı
 Yarımada
 Yenicami
 Yeniköy
 Yeşilköy
 Yeşilyurt
 Yukarıislahiye
 Yüksekköy

References

Districts of Rize Province